Coccomyces is a genus of fungi in the family Rhytismataceae.

The ascocarps of Coccomyces species form within the epidermal layer of a plant host. Many species are foliicolous.

Species
A 2008 estimate placed 116 species in the genus. , Index Fungorum accepts 106 valid species in Coccomyces:

Coccomyces agathidicola
Coccomyces annulatus
Coccomyces antillarum
Coccomyces araucariae
Coccomyces arbutifolius
Coccomyces arctostaphyli
Coccomyces atactus
Coccomyces aurei
Coccomyces australis
Coccomyces basizonatus
Coccomyces binnaburrensis
Coccomyces bipartitus
Coccomyces boydii
Coccomyces canarii
Coccomyces castanopsidis
Coccomyces cembrae
Coccomyces circinatus
Coccomyces clavatus
Coccomyces clementsiorum
Coccomyces clusiae
Coccomyces cocoës
Coccomyces concolor
Coccomyces consociatus
Coccomyces coronatus
Coccomyces crateriformis
Coccomyces croceus
Coccomyces crystalligerus
Coccomyces cunninghamii
Coccomyces cupressini
Coccomyces cyclobalanopsidis
Coccomyces delta
Coccomyces dentatus
Coccomyces dimorphus
Coccomyces duplicarioides
Coccomyces ericae
Coccomyces farlowii
Coccomyces foliicola
Coccomyces fujianensis
Coccomyces fuscus
Coccomyces gaultheriae
Coccomyces globososimilis
Coccomyces globosus
Coccomyces guizhouensis
Coccomyces heterophyllae
Coccomyces huangshanensis
Coccomyces hypodermatis
Coccomyces illiciicola
Coccomyces insignis
Coccomyces irretitus
Coccomyces keteleeriae
Coccomyces kinabaluensis
Coccomyces kirkii
Coccomyces lauraceus
Coccomyces ledi
Coccomyces leptideus
Coccomyces leptosporus
Coccomyces libocedri
Coccomyces lijiangensis
Coccomyces limitatus
Coccomyces longwoodicus
Coccomyces magnus
Coccomyces mertensianae
Coccomyces minimus
Coccomyces monticola
Coccomyces mucronatoides
Coccomyces mucronatus
Coccomyces multangularis
Coccomyces niveus
Coccomyces neolitseae – China
Coccomyces noosanus
Coccomyces occultus
Coccomyces palmicola
Coccomyces pampeanus
Coccomyces papillatus
Coccomyces paraphysincrustatus
Coccomyces parasiticus
Coccomyces parvulus
Coccomyces petersii
Coccomyces philippinus
Coccomyces phyllocladi
Coccomyces phyllocladicola
Coccomyces ponticus
Coccomyces prominens – China
Coccomyces proteae
Coccomyces pseudotsugae
Coccomyces puiggarii
Coccomyces pumilio
Coccomyces radiatus
Coccomyces sichuanensis
Coccomyces sinensis
Coccomyces spegazzinii
Coccomyces strobi
Coccomyces strobilicola
Coccomyces strobilinus
Coccomyces symploci
Coccomyces taiwanensis
Coccomyces tesselatus
Coccomyces triangularis
Coccomyces triseptatus
Coccomyces tumidus
Coccomyces tympanibaculi
Coccomyces tympanidiosporus
Coccomyces urceoloides
Coccomyces urceolus
Coccomyces venezuelae
Coccomyces vilis
Coccomyces wagnerianus
Coccomyces walkeri

References

Leotiomycetes genera
Taxa named by Giuseppe De Notaris